Paul O. Miles (born May 2, 1967, in Austin, Texas) is an American short story writer of slipstream fiction, noted for his pastiches. Miles is perhaps best known for the pulp adventures of the Communist action hero Red Poppy. His writings have appeared in Plot, RevolutionSF, The Big Bigfoot Book, Polyphony 5, and Cross Plains Universe. Miles lives in Austin, Texas.

Short stories
 "Ties That Bind" Plot #5, Win/Spr 1996
 "Death in Four Colors" (the first Red Poppy adventure) RevolutionSF, 2001
 "The Segar Caper, or What Goes Around Comes Around" (a Red Poppy adventure) RevolutionSF, 2002
 "Habe Ich Meinen Eigenen Tod Geseh'n" Polyphony 5, 2005
(Honorable Mention in The Year's Best Fantasy and Horror 2006: 19th Annual Collection, edited by Ellen Datlow, Kelly Link, and Gavin Grant)
 "A Penny a Word" (co-wr Rick Klaw) Cross Plains Universe, 2006
(Finalist for the 2007 WSFA Small Press Award)

Comic book
 "And I Only Am Escaped To Tell Thee" Weird Business, 1995 (adapted from a story by Roger Zelazny art by Barb & Theodore Spoon, Mojo Press)
 "Cowboy Dharma" Wild West Show, 1996 (adapted from the story "Metamorphosis No. 5" by Don Webb art by Newt Manwich, Mojo press)
 "Song of the Yeti" The Big Bigfoot Book, 1996 (art by Dan Burr, Mojo Press)

External links
 "Death in Four Colors"
 "The Segar Caper, or What Goes Around Comes Around"
 Podcast of "A Penny a Word"
 Dark Forces Book Group Blog which Miles is one of the contributors

American short story writers
Pulp fiction writers
African-American writers
American comics writers
Writers from Austin, Texas
Living people
1967 births
21st-century African-American people
20th-century African-American people